The 2020–21 Bundesliga was the 58th season of the Bundesliga, Germany's premier football competition. It began on 18 September 2020 and concluded on 22 May 2021. The season was originally scheduled to begin on 21 August 2020 and conclude on 15 May 2021, though this was delayed due to postponement of the previous season as a result of the COVID-19 pandemic. The fixtures were announced on 7 August 2020.

Bayern Munich were the defending champions and successfully defended their title, winning their record-extending 9th consecutive title and 31st title overall (30th in the Bundesliga era) on 8 May with three games to spare. By winning their thirtieth Bundesliga title, Bayern Munich are honoured with a fifth gold star on their team badges and shirts.

Bayern's Robert Lewandowski set a new record for goals scored in a season with 41, surpassing the previous record of 40 goals set by Gerd Müller in 1971–72.

Effects of the COVID-19 pandemic
On 3 September 2020, the DFL General Assembly voted to extend the use of five substitutions in matches to the 2020–21 season, which was implemented at the end of the previous season to lessen the impact of fixture congestion caused by the COVID-19 pandemic. The use of five substitutes, based on the decision of competition organisers, had been extended by IFAB until 2021. Due to the COVID-19 pandemic, the season began with matches behind closed doors or at reduced capacity due to restrictions across German states. Leipzig allowed up to 8,500 spectators to begin the season, while regulations in Berlin allowed for up to 5,000 supporters.

Summary
Bayern Munich began the season less than a month after defeating Paris Saint-Germain in the Champions League final, as the match had been delayed due to the COVID-19 pandemic. In their first game, they beat Schalke 04 8–0, and were the dominant side early on in the season. After a 3–2 away victory over title contenders Borussia Dortmund in November, many pundits praised Bayern as the best team in Europe.  This praise continued all season long, with former Bayern manager Pep Guardiola proclaiming them the best club in Europe in March. Bayern mathematically confirmed their ninth consecutive Bundesliga title on 8 May 2021 with three matches to spare, following closest contender RB Leipzig's 2–3 loss to Dortmund. The title was Bayern's 30th Bundesliga and 31st German championship overall, which would see them add a fifth star to their badge in the following season.

Meanwhile, Schalke 04 endured a disaster season, failing to win a game in nine consecutive months dating back to the previous season, before defeating a fourth-tier club in the German Cup.  They failed to win thirty Bundesliga matches in a row, falling one short of the all-time record set by Tasmania Berlin in 1965–66, before a 4–0 win against 1899 Hoffenheim in January.  Schalke had announced before the season that they had debts of over 200 million, which led them to slash spending. The poor results led to departures for executives and managers. Former Schalke star Klaas-Jan Huntelaar returned to Schalke from Ajax in January in an attempt to stave off relegation, but he was unable to prevent Schalke from being relegated for the first time in over thirty years.

A hot start to the season for Robert Lewandowski led to early talk that he could break Gerd Müller's 49-year-old record of 40 goals scored in one Bundesliga season, with teammate Thomas Müller suggesting it could happen back in October. Lewandowski capped off a successful year in December by winning his first FIFA Men's Player of the Year award. As Lewandowski continued his strong performances, interest in him overtaking Müller's record grew from various media outlets.  However, a knee injury suffered whilst on international duty on 31 March threatened Lewandowski's record-chase and kept him out of action for a month.  Lewandowski returned to action in April, just five goals away from equalling the single-season goal record. On 15 May 2021, Lewandowski scored his 40th goal of the season against SC Freiburg with one match to spare, therefore equalling Gerd Müller's record tally from 1971–72. In the last match of the season the following week, Lewandowski scored his 41st league goal in the final minute of the match against FC Augsburg to break Müller's record.

Teams

A total of 18 teams participated in the 2020–21 edition of the Bundesliga.

Team changes

Stadiums and locations

Personnel and kits

Managerial changes

League table

Results

Relegation play-offs

All times are CEST (UTC+2).

Overview

|}

Matches

1. FC Köln won 5–2 on aggregate, and therefore both clubs remained in their respective leagues.

Statistics

Top scorers

Hat-tricks

4 Player scored four goals.

Clean sheets

Number of teams by state

Awards

Monthly awards

Annual awards

Team of the season

Notes

References

Bundesliga seasons
1
Germany